Halber Mensch (or  Mensch; English: Half Person) is the third studio album by German industrial band Einstürzende Neubauten, released on 2 September 1985 by Some Bizzare Records in the U.K. and by What's So Funny About GmbH in Germany. In the U.S., the album was distributed by Rough Trade Records.

Background 

Halber Mensch shows a wider artistic range for the group, incorporating elements of electronic dance music in "Yü-Gung (Fütter mein Ego)" and performing the title track nearly a cappella. The group also expands their dynamic range; Blixa Bargeld's voice in "Seele Brennt" suddenly switches from a barely audible whisper to a high-pitched scream, while quiet bass guitar overtones float over relatively restrained percussion in "Letztes Biest (am Himmel)".

Critical reception 

Trouser Press described Halber Mensch as "[Einstürzende Neubauten's] strongest record" and "truly remarkable." AllMusic called it "an excellent feat of industrial music."
In a 2019 feature, Pitchfork named it the second-best industrial album of all time.

Reissue 
In 2002, after a continuous conflict with Some Bizzare Records, the band released a remastered reissue of the album through their own label Potomak, with a slight variation of the cover image.

Track listing

Personnel 

 Einstürzende Neubauten

 Blixa Bargeld – production
 Mark Chung – production
 Alexander Hacke – production
 N.U. Unruh – production
 F.M. Einheit – production

 Additional personnel

 Ma Gita – vocals
 Monika – vocals
 Sabrine – vocals
 Verena – vocals

 Technical

 Gareth Jones – production, recording and mixing on all tracks except "Seele Brent"
 Nainz Watts – engineering
 Thomas Stern – engineering
 Michael Zimmerling – recording and mixing on "Seele Brennt"
 Tim Young – mastering
 Animal House – sleeve design
 Vincent Huang – sleeve photography

References

External links 
 

Einstürzende Neubauten albums
1985 albums
Albums produced by Gareth Jones (music producer)
Some Bizzare Records albums